Australia has a rich history of bidding for and hosting major international multi-sport events and world championships. It has hosted two Summer Olympics, one Summer Paralympics and four Commonwealth Games.

Background

Australian Government provides funding for the hosting of major sports events in Australia. It provided $247.3 million in funding for the hosting of the 2000 Sydney Olympics and Paralympics. In recent years, it has provided funding to 2015 Asian Cup, 2015 Cricket World Cup, 2015 Netball World Cup and 2018 Commonwealth Games. For the 2015 Cricket World Cup, it provided $14 million in funding. Its objectives in providing funding were to 
inspire Australian children to be active as well as providing a boost to the economy. The event held in both Australia and New Zealand was expected to inject $360 million directly into both economies.

Several Australian state and territory governments have established major event organisations to assist in the bidding and financing for major international sporting events in Australia. Their objectives are to improve their economies through tourism and further develop community and sporting facilities. Examples of these organisations are Victorian Major Events Company, Events New South Wales and Tourism and Events Queensland.

The cost of bidding and hosting sporting events has sometimes come under scrutiny. It was reported that Melbourne's 2014 Australian Formula 1 Grand Prix cost taxpayers almost $60 million. This was an additional $9.3 million than 2013 and due to declining ticket sales and increased costs. Australia unsuccessfully bidded for he 2018 FIFA World Cup and 2022 FIFA World Cups. The bid was managed by Football Federation Australia and was granted $42 million in Australian Government funding. The bid came under scrutiny as only one vote out of 22 of the FIFA Executive Committee members was obtained and the ethics of Australia's bidding process.

International multi-sport competitions
Includes international multi-sport events that are held on a regular schedule.

(est) – estimate in reports 
n/a – not applicable as event primarily for participants and low number of paying spectators

Other international multi-sport events that are held in an Australia on a regular basis are:
 Australian Youth Olympic Festival – commenced in 2007 and is biannual event organised by the Australian Olympic Committee. invited.
 Arafura Games – commenced in 1991 and is biannual event held in Darwin, Northern Territory. Athletes with a disability are invited to compete. It was not held in 2013.

International sports championships
Includes world championships, regional championships and high-profile international events. These events are held throughout the world on a regular schedule.

Annual international sporting events
International events that are held in Australia annually. These events include both Australian and overseas athletes and teams.

Most national teams including Men's cricket, Southern Stars (women's cricket), Diamonds (women's netball) Socceroos (men's football), Matildas (women's football), Kookaburras (men's hockey), Hockeyroos (women's hockey), Boomers (men's basketball), Opals (women's basketball), Stingers (women's water polo), Sharks (men's water polo) and Volleyroos (men's volleyball) often play international matches in Australia during the year.

See also
Sport in Australia
List of multi-sport events

References

 List
Multi-sport events
Australia